Laugh It Off is a 1939 American musical film directed by Albert S. Rogell and starring Johnny Downs, Constance Moore, Marjorie Rambeau and Cecil Cunningham. It was shot at Universal City in Hollywood. The film's sets were designed by the art director Jack Otterson.

Synopsis
Four veteran actresses are turned out of an retirement home for entertainers when the Spencer Trust that owns it goes bust. One of them gets her lawyer nephew to seek out the only remaining member of the Spencer family, a young woman named Ruth, who proves sympathetic but has no money to help. They next turn to the idea of reopening a failed gambling club as a popular nightclub in which they will all appear and sing. However this threatens to embarrass their respectable relations who try and prevent it.

Cast

 Johnny Downs as Stephen 'Steve' Hannis
 Constance Moore as Ruth Spencer
 Marjorie Rambeau as Sylvia Swan
 Cecil Cunningham as Tess Gibson
 Hedda Hopper as Elizabeth 'Lizzie' Rockingham
 Janet Beecher as Mary Carter
 Edgar Kennedy as Judge John J. McGuinnis
 Tom Dugan as Rod Bates
 William Demarest as Barney 'Gimpy' Cole
 Horace McMahon as 	Phil Ferrranti
 Paula Stone as Linda Lane
 Chester Clute as 	Eliot Rigby
 Louise Bates as 	Ellen
 John Dilson as Dr. Swan
 Gertrude Hoffman as 	Carrie 
 Claire Whitney as Miss Martin 
 Lillian West as Sarah 
 Alan Edwards as Harvey Carter 
 Jack Norton as 	Thomas J. Carter, the Drunk 
 Brooks Benedict as Casino Croupier
 Dale Van Sickel as 	Policeman 
 Fay McKenzie as Chorus Girl

References

Bibliography
 Hischack, Thomas S.. 1939: Hollywood's Greatest Year. Rowman & Littlefield,  2017.

External links

1939 films
1939 musical films
1930s English-language films
American black-and-white films
American musical films
Universal Pictures films
Films directed by Albert S. Rogell
1930s American films